The 2011–12 season was the 66th season in Rijeka's history. It was their 21st season in the Prva HNL and 38th successive top tier season.

Competitions

Prva HNL

Classification

Results summary

Results by round

Matches

Prva HNL

Source: HRnogomet.com

Croatian Cup

Source: HRnogomet.com

Squad statistics
Competitive matches only.  Appearances in brackets indicate numbers of times the player came on as a substitute.

See also
2011–12 Prva HNL
2011–12 Croatian Cup

Notes

External sources
 2011–12 Prva HNL at HRnogomet.com
 2011–12 Croatian Cup at HRnogomet.com 
 Prvenstvo 2011.-2012. at nk-rijeka.hr

HNK Rijeka seasons
Rijeka